The Greek root -phil- originates from the Greek word meaning "love". For example, philosophy (along with the Greek root -soph- meaning 'wisdom') is the study of human customs and the significance of life. One of the most common uses of the root -phil- is with philias.

A philia is the love or obsession with a particular thing or subject. The suffix -philia is used to specify the love or obsession with something more specific. It is somewhat antonymic to -phobia. Philias can be biological (e.g. rhizophilia, preference for living on roots) or chemical (e.g. chromophilous, materials that stain easily), or can be a hobby/liking (e.g. icthyophilia, love for fish)

 as a Greek word for love refers to brotherly love, including friendship and affection. This contrasts to the Greek terms Eros, or sexual/romantic love, and agape, or detached, spiritual love. However, English usage differs in some cases from the etymological use, and several of these words refer in English not to brotherly love but to sexual attraction.

The suffix -phile (or, in a few cases, -philiac) applies to someone who has one of these philia. It is the antonym of -phobic.

Phil- (philo-) may also be used as a prefix with a similar meaning.

Biology 

 Acidophilia: preference of acidic conditions
 Alkaliphilia: preference of alkaline environments
 Anthophilia: attraction to flowers
 Anthropophile: attracted to humans (e.g., parasites)
 Anemophily: a form of pollination whereby pollen is distributed by wind
 Capnophile: microorganism that thrives in the presence of high concentrations of carbon dioxide
 Cryophilia: preference for cold environments, climates, objects and low temperatures; e.g., Protea cryophila (Snow Protea)
 Dacryphilia: attraction to tears
 Dendrophilia: preference of trees or other plants
 Entomophilous: adapted for pollination by insects
 Extremophilia: preference of living extremal conditions for some microorganisms
 Geophilia: preferring to organisms that prefer the soil
 Halophilia: attraction to salt or salt-water
 Heliophilia: attraction to sunlight
 Hydrophilia: attraction to water
 Hyperthermophilia: organisms that thrive in extremely hot environments
 Limnophilia: preference of ponds or marshes
 Lithophilia: preference or affinity to stones
 Mesophilia: preference of moderate temperatures in microorganisms
 Microaerophilia: organisms that can tolerate or require environments containing low levels of oxygen
 Myrmecophilia: love for the ants
 Nemophilia: love of the woods and forests
 Necrophilia: an attraction to the dead
 Neutrophile: organism that thrives in a neutral pH environment
 Nyctophilia: an attraction to darkness or night; finding relaxation or comfort in the darkness. Preferring nighttime activities to daytime activities
 Ombrophilia: affinity to large amounts of rainfall
 Petrophilia: preference of living or spending time in rocky areas
 Photophilia: preference of living or spending time in lighted conditions
 Pluviophilia: affinity to rain
 Psammophile: a plant loving sandy areas
 Psychrophilia: preference of cold temperatures
 Rheophilia: preference of living in running water
 Sciaphilia: preference of living in shady or dark areas (as opposed to photophilia)
 Thermophilia: love of high temperatures; thriving in high temperatures (e.g. microbes)
 Tropophilia: preference of seasonal extremes of climate
 Trichophilia: an attraction to hair or fur
 Vorarephilia: sexual attraction to being eaten by or eating humans
 Xenophilia: an affection for unknown, foreign objects, or people
 Xerophilia: love of living or spending time in very dry conditions
 Xylophilia: love of wood
 Zoophily: a form of pollination whereby pollen is distributed by animals

Chemistry and physics 
 Electrophile: a chemical species that forms bonds with nucleophiles by accepting a pair of electrons
 Hydrophilic: (of a substance) having a tendency to interact with or be dissolved by water and other polar substances
 Lipophilic: solubility or solvability of a substance with lipids
 Lipophilic: (of a substance) in microfluidics, enriching on channel walls instead of in the middle of the channels (e.g. air bubbles)
 Nucleophile: a chemical species that donates an electron pair to form a chemical bond. Antonym: electrophile

Hobbies 
 Audiophilia: love of high-fidelity sound reproduction
 Arctophilia: love of teddy bears; especially, an interest in collecting teddy bears
 Bibliophilia: love of books
 Cartophilia: love of maps
 Cinephilia: love of cinema and film
 Philately: the study of stamps and postal history and other related items
 Glossophilia: love of languages (synonym for philology)
 Logophilia: love of words — logophiles may be interested in word games, such as crosswords, or Scrabble, and in the extreme, derive enjoyment from reading things commonly given less notice, such as labels
 Metrophilia: love of the metro rail or subway systems
 Neophilia: love of the latest novelties and trends
 Oenophilia: love of wine
 Ornithophilia: love of birds
 Taphophilia: love of graves, cemeteries and funerals
 Technophilia: love of technology
 Videophile: person who is concerned with achieving high-quality results in the recording and playback of movies, TV programs, etc

National or ethnic
 Anglophile: a non-English person who is extremely fond of all things English. Antonym: Anglophobe
 Australophile: a fan of Australian culture
 Austrophile: a fan of Austrian culture
 Europhile: a person who wants to increase cooperation between governments within the European Union. Antonym: Eurosceptic
 Fennophile: a fan of Finnish culture
 Francophile or Gallophile: a fan of French culture. Antonym: Francophobe
 Germanophile or Teutophile: a fan of German culture. Antonyms: Germanophobe and teutophobia
 Hellenophile: a fan of Greek culture (i.e. someone prone to philhellenism)
 Hibernophile: a lover of Ireland or Irish culture
 Indophile: a fan of India
 Italophile: a fan of Italy. Antonym: Italophobia
 Japanophile: a non-Japanese person with a strong interest in Japan or Japanese culture. Antonym: Japanophobe
 Judeophile: a lover of Jews or Jewish culture. Antonyms: Judeophobe and antisemite
 Kartvelophile: an interest for Georgian culture
 Negrophilia: a term used in the 1920s and 30s for the interest in Europe for African and African-American culture
 Persophilia: a fan of Iranian culture
 Russophilia: love of Russia and Russians. Antonym: Russophobe
 Sinophile: a non-Chinese person with a strong interest in China or Chinese culture. Antonym: Sinophobe
 Slavophile: a fan of Slavic culture
 Suecophile: someone with a great interest in the Swedish language and culture
 Turkophile: a fan of Turkey and Turkish culture

Sexual paraphilias 
 List of paraphilias
 Paraphilia (previously known as sexual perversion and sexual deviation) is the experience of intense sexual arousal to atypical objects, situations, fantasies, behaviors, or individuals. Such attraction may be labeled sexual fetishism

Other 
 Biophilia hypothesis
 Erotophilia: a personality trait which assesses an individual's disposition to respond to sexual cues
 Haemophilia: a disease relating to blood clotting
 Homophile: a term used to refer to gay people or those who supported homosexuality, prior to gay liberation and other LGBT social movements. It was proposed as an alternative to homosexual, that would have a more positive connotation, before the word "gay" became dedicated for this purpose
 Pluviophile: love of the rain
 Retrophilia: love of things of the past
 Theophilia: love of a god
 Topophilia: a strong sense of place, which often becomes mixed with the sense of cultural identity among certain people and a love of certain aspects of such a place

Prefix phil- 
 Philadelphia
 Philippines
 Philanderer
 Philandry
 Philanthropy
 Philately
 Philhellenism: the love of Greek culture (this may also be called hellenophilia)
 Philogyny
 Philology
 Philomath
 Philosophy
 Phillumenism

See also 
 List of phobias

Suffixes of Greek origin
Love
Infixes
Prefixes
English suffixes